Ryston railway station was a railway station serving Fordham, Norfolk. It was on a branch line from Denver.

History
The Downham and Stoke Ferry Railway opened on 1 August 1882, and Ryston station opened with the line. Passengers services were withdrawn on 22 September 1930, and the line closed to all traffic in 1965.

Route

See also 
 Abbey and West Dereham

Notes

References

External links
 Ryston station on navigable 1946 O. S. map

Former Great Eastern Railway stations
Disused railway stations in Norfolk
Railway stations in Great Britain opened in 1882
Railway stations in Great Britain closed in 1930